Huddersfield railway station serves the town of Huddersfield in West Yorkshire, England.

The station is managed by TransPennine Express, which provides trains between Manchester and Liverpool in the North West and Newcastle and Middlesbrough in the North East and also to York, Scarborough and Hull via Leeds.

Huddersfield station is the second busiest station in West Yorkshire, with Leeds being the first.

The station building

Designed by the architect James Pigott Pritchett and built by the firm of Joseph Kaye in 1846–50 using the neo-classical style, the station is well known in architectural circles for its classical-style facade, with a portico of the Corinthian order, consisting of six columns in width and two in depth, which dominates St George's Square. It faces out towards Lion Buildings. It is a Grade I listed building. In the 1880s, the station was extended with the installation of an island platform with an overall roof. The roof partially collapsed on 10 August 1885, killing four people.

The station frontage was described by John Betjeman as "the most splendid in England" and by Sir Nikolaus Pevsner as "one of the best early railway stations in England" and "the only important Victorian railway station [in the West Riding]". Similarly, Simon Jenkins reported it to be one of the best 100 stations in Britain.

Two pubs are within the station frontage, to each side of the main entrance: The Head Of Steam and The King's Head (previously known as The Station Tavern). Both facilities are accessible from Platform 1. At the building's entrance, the booking office is to the left and to the right are the train timetables and a newsagent. Platforms 4 to 8 are located via a lift or subway, accessed from Platform 1.  The public conveniences are located through this subway at the top of the steps to Platforms 4–8. The platforms are all covered by a large canopy. To the rear of the station are some carriage sidings.

The station is staffed 24 hours a day, with the booking office open from 05:45 to 20:00 Mondays to Saturdays and 07:45 to 20:00 on Sundays. There are also four self-service ticket machines available in the ticket hall for use when the booking office is closed or for collecting pre-paid tickets. Automated train announcements, customer help points and digital display screens provide train running information on all platforms. In addition to the aforementioned pubs, the station has a waiting room and buffet on platform 4 and a coffee kiosk on platform 1.

Location

The station fronts Saint George's Square, which was refurbished in 2009. The square has been made a pedestrian zone. No car parking is available in front of the station entrance, but it is nearby on Brook Street.

The station is situated a short distance from Huddersfield bus station, so interchange facilities are possible but limited. The Huddersfield FreeCityBus connects the railway station with the bus station, as well as the University of Huddersfield and other areas of the town centre.

There are six platforms:
 Platform 1 – Express services to Manchester Piccadilly, Manchester Airport and Liverpool (via Manchester Victoria).
 Platform 2 – Terminal bay platform for Penistone Line services to/from Sheffield.
 Platform 4 – Stopping services to Leeds (4a) and Manchester Piccadilly (4b). (One evening train from Hull terminates at Platform 4a.)
 Platforms 5 and 6 – Bay platforms for local services to/from  via  and Wakefield Kirkgate.
 Platform 8 – Express services to Leeds, Hull, York, Scarborough, Middlesbrough and Newcastle.

Development
In 2010, Network Rail and First TransPennine Express completed a series of improvements to the station in order to provide better access for passengers. This consisted of two new lifts, and a new staircase to the subway on Platform 1. The new staircase replaced the existing staircase inside the booking hall. As well as this each platform received new information screens.

In early 2011, further improvement works were carried out to the concourse and waiting area. This phase of improvements was funded by the Railway Heritage Trust, Metro, Kirklees council and the National Station's Improvement Programme.  The main purpose of this was to reduce bottlenecks at peak times as well as general crowding. The redundant stable block on Platform 1 was also turned into a staff training centre and toilets.

Automatic ticket barriers were installed at the station in May 2013.

Work is underway on Network Rail's Transpennine Route Upgrade project, which will see electrification of the Huddersfield Line, allowing many of the services through the station to switch to newer, faster electric rolling stock. As part of this project the signal box on platform 4 which was decommissioned previously will be removed, its control area already passed to the York Rail Operating Centre as a part of the Huddersfield Re-signalling project. To match the quadrupling of the line north of Huddersfield, the project will in effect split the existing island platform, extending the existing bay platforms 5 and 6 to form two new through platforms covered by a new roof, and add a new footbridge at the Leeds end.  The process will also include relocating the 1880s island platform tea room, and rotating it through 180 degrees.

Services

A fifth service terminates at Leeds. Three of these are expresses (either non-stop or calling at Dewsbury only), one calls at Dewsbury and Batley and the other serves most local stops to Leeds.

Westbound there are two trains per hour to Manchester Piccadilly, one to Manchester Airport (via ) and two to Liverpool Lime Street via ).

Currently Huddersfield is served by Northern Trains and TransPennine Express.

Future services
London North Eastern Railway planned to operate services from London King's Cross via Leeds, beginning in May 2020. But as of March 2022 this has not taken place.

Steam trains
In keeping with the on-site Head of Steam railway pub, several steam trains still pass through Huddersfield station, including the Cotton Mill Express and the Scarborough Flyer.

On the disused side of Platform 2, an old carriage is bolted to the ground. Set in its window is a plaque commemorating 100 years of Steamtrain Hoorn Medemblik, a Dutch heritage railway.

Station cats

The first station cat, Felix, joined the staff as a nine-week-old kitten in 2011. Since then she has patrolled the station to keep it free from rodents, and even has her own cat-flap to bypass the ticket barriers. In 2016, Felix was promoted to Senior Pest Controller. In 2016, local artist Rob Martin painted a portrait of Felix which now hangs in the station. In 2019, Transpennine Express named a Class 68 locomotive (68031) after Felix.

The second station cat, Bolt, joined the staff in September 2018 as an eight-week-old kitten.

See also
Grade I listed buildings in West Yorkshire
Listed buildings in Huddersfield (Newsome Ward - central area)

References

External links

"St George's Square down the Years", The Examiner, including images of Huddersfield railway station, 11 September 2012

Railway stations in Huddersfield
DfT Category B stations
Grade I listed buildings in West Yorkshire
Grade I listed railway stations
Former Lancashire and Yorkshire Railway stations
Former London and North Western Railway stations
Neoclassical architecture in Yorkshire
Railway stations in Great Britain opened in 1847
Railway stations served by TransPennine Express
Northern franchise railway stations
1847 establishments in England